The 1972–73 Serie D was the twenty-third edition of Serie D, the fourth highest league in the Italian football league system.

A total of 162 teams contested the league, divided into nine groups (in Italian: Gironi) of 18 teams.

League tables

Girone A

Girone B

Girone C

Girone D

Promotion play-offs

|}
Riccione promoted to Serie C.

Girone E

Girone F

Girone G

Girone H

Girone I

References

External links
 1972–73 Serie D at CalcioDiEccellenza.it

Serie D seasons
Italy
4